Ultramares Corporation v. Touche, 174 N.E. 441 (1932) is a US tort law case regarding negligent misstatement, decided by Cardozo, C.J. It contained the now famous line on "floodgates" that the law should not admit "to a liability in an indeterminate amount for an indeterminate time to an indeterminate class."

Facts
In 1924 auditors Touche Niven gave the rubber importer, Fred Stern and Company, an unqualified audit certificate, having failed to discover that management had falsified entries to overstate accounts receivable. The auditors knew that the accounts when certified would be used to raise money and for that purpose supplied 32 certified and serially numbered copies: p. 442. On the faith of one of those copies, given to it on its demand, the plaintiff, Ultramares Corporation, lent Fred Stern and Company money. Stern declared bankruptcy in 1925. Ultramares sued Touche Niven for the amount of the Stern debt, declaring that a careful audit would have shown Stern to be insolvent. The audit was found to be negligent, but not fraudulent. The judge set this finding aside based on the doctrine of privity, which protects auditors from third party suits. An intermediate appellate court reinstated the negligence verdict. The case then went to the New York Court of Appeals, Judge Benjamin Cardozo presiding.

Judgment
Cardozo, C.J., held that the claim in negligence failed on the ground that the auditors owed the plaintiff no duty of care, there being no sufficiently proximate relationship.

A requirement of privity, not of contract but of relationship, was laid down.

Other uses
The rule set forth in Ultramares is still the law in New York: Credit Alliance Corporation v. Arthur Andersen & Co. 483 N.E. 2d 110 (1985).
A much less restrictive rule has been followed elsewhere: see, e.g., Rosenblum Inc. v. Adler 461 A. 2d 138 (1983); Citizens State Bank v. Timm, Schmidt & Co. 335 N.W. 2d 361 (1983).
In Rhode Island Hospital Trust National Bank v. Swartz, Bresenoff, Yavner & Jacobs 455 F. 2d 847, 851, (1972) a United States Court of Appeals, applying Rhode Island law, applied the rule that an accountant should be liable in negligence for careless financial misrepresentations relied upon by actually foreseen and limited classes of persons.
In Ingram Industries Inc. v. Nowicki 527 F. Supp. 683 (1981), a federal judge applying the law of Kentucky relied on Section 552 of the Restatement (Second) of Torts. Section 552 provides:

Information Negligently Supplied for the Guidance of others (1) One who, in the course of his business, profession or employment, or in any other transaction in which he has a pecuniary interest, supplies false information for the guidance of others in their business transactions, is subject to liability for pecuniary loss caused to them by their justifiable reliance upon the information, if he fails to exercise reasonable care or competence in obtaining or communicating the information. (2) Except as stated in subsection (3), the liability stated in subsection (1) is limited to loss suffered (a) by the person or one of a limited group of persons for whose benefit and guidance he intends to supply the information or knows that the recipient intends to supply it; and (b) through reliance upon it in a transaction that he intends the information to influence or knows that the recipient so intends or in a substantially similar transaction. (3) The liability of one who is under a public duty to give the information extends to loss suffered by any of the class of persons for whose benefit the duty is created, in any of the transactions in which it is intended to protect them.

In Bily v. Arthur Young & Co., 3 Cal. 4th 370, 834 P.2d 745, 11 Cal. Rptr. 2d 51 (1992), the Supreme Court of California analyzed Ultramares and subsequent developments in painstaking detail, then followed New York in declining to impose a general duty of care upon accountants as to the conduct of audits extending to parties other than the accountant's own client.  However, the court also adopted the test of Section 552 of Restatement (Second) of Torts under which an accountant can be held liable to third parties under a negligent misrepresentation theory.  Under the Bily analysis, when a company is belatedly found to have cooked its books, an investor who simply assumed the company was solvent cannot recover from its accountants, but an investor who actually requested, read, and relied upon its accountants' audit reports may have a cause of action.

See also
Caparo v. Dickman

References

Chatfield, Michael. "Utramares Corporation v. Touche, Niven & Company." History of Accounting: An International Encyclopedia, New York: Garland Publishing, 1996. full-text

New York (State). Court of Appeals. 	Ultramares Corporation, vs. Touche, Niven & Co. New York, 1930 Vol.1 full-text Vol. 2 full-text

United States tort case law
New York (state) state case law
1932 in United States case law
1932 in New York (state)